The Agency or Agency (known as Mind Games on video) is a 1981 Canadian thriller drama film directed by George Kaczender. The film was written by Noel Hynd.

Based on a novel by Paul Gottlieb, it is a thriller involving creative director Philip Morgan (Lee Majors) who discovers the advertising agency he works for, run by Ted Quinn (Robert Mitchum), is using subliminal advertising to manipulate a senatorial election. It features appearances by Canadian actors Saul Rubinek as a copywriter (earning a "Best Supporting Actor" Genie nomination), Jonathan Welsh as a police detective, and familiar supporting players Michael Kirby and Gary Reineke as hitmen, and Hugh Webster as a prison inmate.

The film was shot on locations in Montreal and rural Quebec.

References

Sources
 Craddock, Jim, editor. VideoHound's Golden Movie Retriever, p. 49, "The Agency". Detroit, Michigan: Thomson Gale, 2007. .
 Agency at IMDb

1980 films
1980s thriller drama films
Canadian thriller drama films
Films directed by George Kaczender
English-language Canadian films
1980 drama films
1980s English-language films
1980s Canadian films